Oleh Andriyovych Ilyin (born 8 June 1997) is a professional Ukrainian football midfielder who plays for Kolos Kovalivka.

Career
Ilyin is a product of the FC Chornomorets Odesa and Dnipro Youth Sportive School systems. In June 2017 he was promoted to the main-team squad of FC Dnipro and made his debut for this team in the Ukrainian Second League.

In February 2018 he joined the Ukrainian First League side FC Kolos Kovalivka.

References

External links
 
 

1997 births
Living people
Footballers from Odesa
Ukrainian footballers
FC Dnipro players
FC Kolos Kovalivka players
Ukrainian Premier League players
Ukrainian First League players
Ukrainian Second League players

Association football midfielders